Asmeer Lathif Mohamed (born May 3, 1983) is a Sri Lankan footballer currently playing for Negombo Youth SC in Negombo and also is a starter on the Sri Lanka national football team.  Mohamed wears jersey number 14 on the Sri Lanka national football team.

References 

Living people
Sri Lankan footballers
1983 births
Blue Star SC players
Association football midfielders
Sri Lanka international footballers
Sri Lanka Football Premier League players